The 2010 TEAN International was a professional tennis tournament played on clay courts. It was the 15th edition of the tournament which was part of the 2010 ATP Challenger Tour. It took place in Alphen aan den Rijn, Netherlands between 7 and 12 September.

ATP entrants

Seeds

 Rankings are as of August 30, 2010.

Other entrants
The following players received wildcards into the singles main draw:
  Bart Brons
  Justin Eleveld
  Robin Haase
  Boy Westerhof

The following players received entry from the qualifying draw:
  Daniel Berta
  Thomas Cazes-Carrère
  Gianni Mina
  Jan-Lennard Struff

The following players received a lucky loser entry:
  Farrukh Dustov

Champions

Men's singles

 Jesse Huta Galung def.  Thomas Schoorel, 6–7(4), 6–4, 6–4

Women's singles
 Julia Schruff def.  Irena Pavlovic 6–0, 6–3

Men's doubles

 Farrukh Dustov /  Bertram Steinberger def.  Roy Bruggeling /  Bas van der Valk, 6–4, 6–1

Women's doubles
 Daniëlle Harmsen /  Bibiane Schoofs def.  Ksenia Lykina /  Irena Pavlovic, 6–3, 6–2

References
Official website
ITF Search 

TEAN International
TEAN International
TEAN International